Hayrenik may refer to:

Hairenik, Armenian-language publication in Watertown, Massachusetts
"Mer Hayrenik", the national anthem of Armenia
Azat Hayrenik or Free Motherland, an Armenian political party in Artsakh (Karabakh)